Francisco Manenti (born 31 October 1996) is an Argentine professional footballer who plays as a centre-back for Newell's Old Boys.

Career
Manenti began his career with Newell's Old Boys. A loan move to Unión Comercio of the Peruvian Primera División was completed on 6 January 2019. He was selected to start a league fixture with Universitario on 17 February, manager Marcelo Vivas allowed him to play fifty-nine minutes of a 1–1 draw before substituting him off for José Rivera. In total, he appeared nine times for the Peruvian club. Upon returning to Argentina, Manenti was loaned out again by Newell's as he agreed terms with newly-promoted Argentine Primera División team Central Córdoba. Five appearances followed.

Career statistics
.

References

External links

1996 births
Living people
Footballers from Rosario, Santa Fe
Argentine people of Italian descent
Argentine footballers
Argentine expatriate footballers
Expatriate footballers in Peru
Argentine expatriate sportspeople in Peru
Association football defenders
Peruvian Primera División players
Argentine Primera División players
Newell's Old Boys footballers
Unión Comercio footballers
Central Córdoba de Santiago del Estero footballers